Following is a list of senators of Martinique, people who have represented the department of Martinique in the Senate of France.

Third Republic

Senators for Martinique under the French Third Republic were:

Fourth Republic

Senators for Martinique under the French Fourth Republic were:

Fifth Republic 
Senators for Martinique under the French Fifth Republic were:

References

Sources

 
Lists of members of the Senate (France) by department